Konstantinovy Lázně is a spa municipality and village in Tachov District in the Plzeň Region of the Czech Republic. It has about 900 inhabitants.

Administrative parts
Villages of Břetislav, Dlouhé Hradiště, Nová Ves, Okrouhlé Hradiště, Poloučany, Potín and Šipín are administrative parts of Konstantinovy Lázně.

Spa
The local spa focuses on the treatment of cardiovascular diseases and diseases of the musculoskeletal system. The clients of the spa are treated with balneotherapy. The Konstantinovy Lázně spring has the highest content of free carbon dioxide in the Czech Republic.

References

Villages in Tachov District
Spa towns in the Czech Republic